Eddy Arnold Time is an American musical television series syndicated to local stations from 1955 through 1957. The show consisted of 26 half-hour filmed episodes starring Eddy Arnold in different roles within a musical narrative. Arnold portrayed, among others, a lumberjack, a traveling salesman, a cowboy, a pet shop owner, himself, and even Stephen Foster.

Production and cast

Produced, directed and written by Chicago NBC veteran Ben Park, the series featured Betty Johnson, who usually played Arnold's romantic interest; and in supporting roles, the Jordanaires, using the name Gordonaires. A promotional booklet for the program explained that the group used the name Jordanaires "only for their recordings." The more complete explanation is that it legally protected the producers in case the group, which owned the name Jordanaires, left the program prematurely. For this show, the group was composed of Hoyt Hawkins, Hugh Jarett, Neal Matthews, Jr. and Gordon Stoker. Guitarist Hank Garland and Roy Wiggins (steel guitar) also made occasional appearances. A young Ed Asner appeared in one episode.

The producers termed the program, filmed at Kling Studios in Chicago, Illinois, a TV filmusical. Production began in October 1954; it was among the earliest syndicated American TV programs. Although popular in some small markets, it suffered from uninspired performances and storylines, a poor soundtrack and inadequate marketing.

In 1959, episodes were edited together with segments from The Old American Barn Dance and Jimmy Dean's Town and Country Time (a local Washington, D.C. program) and syndicated by producer Bernard L. Schubert under the title, Your Musical Jamboree.

Episodes (22 of 26)

Notes

References 

 Eddy Arnold Time  © 1955, Trinity Music, Inc., New York, N.Y.

External links
Public domain episode on Internet Archive

1955 American television series debuts
1957 American television series endings
1950s American music television series
Black-and-white American television shows
English-language television shows
First-run syndicated television programs in the United States